"All I See" is a song recorded by Australian Kylie Minogue for her tenth studio album, X (2007). The song was written by Jonas Jeberg, Mich Hedin Hansen, Edwin "Lil' Eddie" Serrano and produced by Jeberg and Cutfather. It was released digitally as a lead single in North America on 11 March 2008. The song was released to American radio formats on 15 April 2008. A version featuring rapper Mims was released to radio formats and included as a bonus track on the American edition of X. On 22 November 2008, the song was also released as the fifth single from, X in Australia. Musically, the song is an R&B song. The song contains an interpolation from Gap Band's "Outstanding", which was written by Raymond Calhoun.

Release
To promote the single and the album in the United States, Minogue appeared on several television programmes. On 31 March 2008, she appeared on the Today show for an interview with Matt Lauer. On 1 April, Minogue performed "All I See" live on Dancing with the Stars. On 7 April 2008, Minogue appeared and performed "All I See" on The Ellen DeGeneres Show.
The single was particularly released in the US and in Canada to boost Minogue's image in the States, as it appeared she had a low profile, but the song only managed to peak at number 3 in the US dance charts.

Music video
The promotional music video for "All I See" was directed by William Baker, Minogue's creative director. It was filmed in three hours while Minogue was on break from KylieX2008 tour rehearsals. Filmed in black-and-white, it features Minogue in various outfits (mainly a dominatrix) and dancer Marco da Silva dancing in front of a white background. The video premiered on Minogue's website on 18 April 2008.

Critical response
"All I See" received generally mixed reviews from most music critics. Sal Cinquemani from Slant Magazine gave it an extended review. He said:

Minogue has churned out three singles from her album X since its international release last year, but it's another song, "All I See," that will be the record's official first single in the U.S. It's one of only three tracks that don't seem to fit the otherwise consistent Euro-disco mash-up of the singer's 10th studio album (the belated Ray of Light rip-off "No More Rain" and the Fergie/Gwen-meets-the-Pussycat-Dolls-meets-"SexyBack" monstrosity that is "Nu-Di-Ty" are the other offenders), but that's exactly why it's a perfect fit for this country. In his review of X, Slant critic Dave Hughes compared "All I See" to Janet Jackson's 1997 "Together Again," and while the breathy vocals are totally Janet, the rest of the song is a virtual carbon copy of Ne-Yo's "Because of You," right down to the measured 4/4 beat and harpsichord.

If radio programmers could find room on their playlists for Natasha Bedingfield's market-pandering "Love Like This," then surely they can find space for "All I See." Although a remix featuring MIMS will be serviced to radio stations soon, there's still no video in sight, so if the song fails, Minogue's American fans can blame her record label, which hasn't figured out how to market the superstar in the U.S. since "Can't Get You Out of My Head".

Live performances
Minogue performed "All I See" and "Can't Get You Out of My Head" live on the results show 1 April 2008 of the American program Dancing with the Stars. She also performed the song on The Late Late Show with Craig Ferguson, and The Ellen DeGeneres Show, and at selected shows of the KylieX2008 concert tour.

Track listings
 US CD1
 "All I See (feat. Mims)" – 3:51
 "All I See (Album Version)" – 3:04

 US CD2
 "All I See (Album Version)" – 3:04
 "All I See (Extended Version)" – 7:11
 "All I See (Instrumental)" – 7:09

Remixes
 Mark Picchiotti Mixes
 "All I See (Mark Picchiotti Proper House Vocal)" – 7:50
 "All I See (Mark Picchiotti Proper House Dub)" – 7:42
 "All I See (Mark Picchiotti Proper Radio Edit)" – 3:15
 "All I See (Mark Picchiotti Funk Vocal)" – 7:31
 "All I See (Mark Picchiotti Funk Dub)" – 7:48
 "All I See (Mark Picchiotti Funk Radio Edit)" – 3:32

Charts

Weekly charts

Year-end charts

Release history

References

2007 songs
2008 singles
Black-and-white music videos
Australian contemporary R&B songs
Kylie Minogue songs
Songs written by Cutfather
Songs written by Lil' Eddie
Songs written by Jonas Jeberg
Song recordings produced by Cutfather
Parlophone singles
Articles containing video clips